The Blossom Expedition was a collecting expedition that principally procured ornithological specimens from Africa, South America, and the islands of the South Atlantic Ocean for the collections of the Cleveland Museum of Natural History. The expedition was initiated by Leonard Sanford, with museum trustee Elizabeth Blossom serving as its eponymous benefactor.

The expedition took place from 1923 to 1926, with a scientific crew led by ornithologist George Finlay Simmons. Their ship, the Blossom, was initially captained by Emery Gray, though he left later in the expedition. They ultimately brought thirteen thousand natural history specimens and thousands of photographs to the United States, despite challenges brought about by the physical limits of their ship, personnel changes, and severe weather.

Background
Leonard Sanford, a surgeon and patron of ornithology, proposed collecting specimens of the world's birds to be shared by museums everywhere and brought the idea before Cleveland Museum of Natural History director Paul M. Rea in 1922.

On March 7, 1923, museum trustees announced a two-year expedition with the purpose of bringing back ornithological specimens from islands of the South Atlantic Ocean, as well as other larger specimens. At the time, the American Museum of Natural History had initiated the Whitney South Sea Expedition, and the two museums planned to exchange material to enhance both collections. Elizabeth Bingham Blossom, a trustee of the Cleveland museum, was to finance the museum's expedition.

Ship and crew

Rea and the museum trustees selected George Finlay Simmons, an ornithologist and future president of the University of Montana, as the leader of the expedition. The scientific crew consisted of taxidermist Robert H. Rockwell, biologist Kenneth Cuyler, and field naturalist Allan Moses. To find a ship captain, the museum ran a newspaper advertisement titled "Man Inclined to Piracy Sought as Ship Captain: Skillful Seaman Wanted for Ornithological Expedition in South Atlantic", which ultimately resulted in the selection of Emery Gray. Manuel Tomas Chantre, a former member of the United States Navy, served as the ship's navigator. John da Lomba, a Cape Verde native, assisted with sailing. They also brought along Carl T. Robertson, an associate editor from The Plain Dealer who was to chronicle the expedition, as well as a group of college-aged men.

The expedition's ship was of the "old-fashioned windjammer" type, specifically a schooner, and was built in 1920. When she was purchased by the museum, her name was changed from the Lucy R to the Blossom, after Elizabeth Blossom. She was completely revamped with equipment necessary for a long expedition, including new sails and a motor for raising the anchor, and contained a cabin for living space, a darkroom, a room for drying specimens, and a radio room. Held in storage were "approximately one-and-one-half tons of food for each man" as well as coffee, tea, cocoa, and barrels containing  of water.

Expedition

Journey to Cape Verde

The Blossom began its journey from New London, Connecticut on October 29, 1923. After a stop at Gardiner's Bay, Long Island to perform additional work on the ship, the expedition left on November 10. Flooding caused several issues on the ship, such as damage to equipment, spoilage of food supplies, and contamination of barrels holding fresh drinking water due to their improper sealing. The Blossom reached Cape Verde on December 10, where they began collecting specimens.  off course, the expedition was reported lost back home.

By the time the expedition reached São Vicente, Cape Verde, the Blossom had been heavily damaged. They spent a month there while the ship was repaired and continued collecting specimens. Meanwhile, Rockwell and da Lomba separately went to Brava, where they planned to collect specimens for ten days. The men were left stranded at Brava for three months, as Simmons decided to explore the rest of the Cape Verde archipelago before recovering them.

Continental Africa

The angered Rockwell only conceded when Simmons told him that the expedition was to travel to continental Africa to collect big-game specimens. Although the main goal of the expedition to northwestern Africa was to collect birds to use in a comparative study of specimens from Cape Verde, Cuyler and Rockwell were sent on a side expedition in Bondu. They spent several weeks collecting larger mammals before returning to the expedition.

After spending almost five months in continental Africa, they had collected a total of nearly eighteen hundred bird skins, six hundred birds preserved in formaldehyde, 166 pressed plants, twenty-six large mammals, and more than 350 small mammals, reptiles, and fishes. They had also completed fieldwork at every location, which produced measurements, color studies, photographs, and film stock. Museum director Rea met with the expedition in Dakar, and separately returned to Cleveland with specimens and fieldwork collected by the expedition after six weeks. Gray and Chantre both left the expedition in Dakar and were replaced with members of the Italian Regia Marina, while Robertson and the group of college-aged men were replaced by a group of sailors from Cape Verde.

Return to the United States

The expedition originally planned to first travel to Trindade and Martin Vaz and then move on to South Georgia Island. Ultimately, they could not travel to South Georgia Island because of personnel changes, delays caused by severe weather, and the physical limits of the ship. The Blossom was ill-prepared for such a journey; her anchor hoist broke upon their departure from Africa and had to be hauled on board manually.

The Blossom reached Trindade and Martin Vaz more than forty days later, where the expedition made biological surveys. Rockwell and Moses collected specimens of seabirds and spent a month in a cave they secured after driving away land crabs. The two men joined with the rest of the expedition to travel to Rio de Janeiro, where they experienced difficulty in finding replacements for their crew, and then to Ascension Island, Saint Helena, Fernando de Noronha, and Rocas. At Fernando de Noronha, the expedition collected specimens of vireos, among other species. On their way back to the United States, they spent five days studying in the southwestern corner of the Sargasso Sea.

After the Blossom was docked in Charleston, the museum sold her to da Lomba, who then used her for business ventures until she was shipwrecked off the coast of Africa in 1930.

Outcome
The expedition produced thirteen thousand specimens of animals, in addition to photographs, thousands of feet of film, and scientific data despite not making it to South Georgia Island as originally planned. Of the specimens collected, over five thousand were birds, while most of the remainder were saltwater fishes and invertebrates.

According to the Encyclopedia of Cleveland History, the cost of the expedition was $75,000. The Morning Journal provides a figure of $125,000 for the amount of funding provided by Elizabeth Blossom, which accounts for the purchase of the Blossom and the salaries of its crew.

After the expedition, Simmons worked at the Cleveland Museum of Natural History as a curator of ornithology, where he arranged the museum's collections for research. Cuyler also took a position as part of the museum's scientific staff.

See also
 Whitney South Sea Expedition
 Brewster–Sanford expedition

Notes

References

Citations

Sources

Further reading
 
 

African expeditions
Atlantic expeditions
South American expeditions
Expeditions from the United States
Ornithological equipment and methods